Aluri is an Indian surname of some Telugu people of Andhra Pradesh. Āla in Telugu and Sanskrit means "Breed cattle"  and Ūri means "Belonging to the village" in Telugu.

 Aluri Venkata Subbarao (1908–1975), Indian film multilingual writer, producer and director

Telugu-language surnames